Hatem Ali Talukdar was a Bangladesh Awami League politician and the former Member of Parliament of Tangail-2.

Career
Talukdar was a student leader in the 1940 of East Pakistan Chattra League in Jamalpur Sub-division. He helped Sheikh Mujibur Rahman and Maulana Abdul Hamid Khan Bhashani organize a conference of the League in Jamalpur.

Talukdar was elected to parliament from Tangail-2 as a Bangladesh Awami League candidate in 1973.

Death 
Ali died on 24 October 1997.

References

Awami League politicians
1st Jatiya Sangsad members
1997 deaths
Year of birth missing